Leptospermum confertum is a species of shrub that is endemic to East Mount Barren on the south coast of Western Australia. It has rough bark, crowded narrow club-shaped leaves and white flowers that are pinkish in bud.

Description
Young branches are hairy at first and have a small swelling below each leaf base. The flowers are borne singly in leaf axils with pale reddish brown bracts and bracteoles at their base. Flowering occurs between October and January.

Taxonomy and naming
Leptospermum confertum was first formally described in 1989 by Joy Thompson in the journal Telopea. The specific epithet (confertum) is from the Latin confertus, meaning "close together, crowded or dense", referring to the crowded leaves.

Distribution and habitat
This tea-tree is found on slopes and in rocky gullies along the south coast on East Mount Barren in the Fitzgerald River National Park.

Conservation status
Leptospermum confertum is classified as "Priority Two" by the Western Australian Government Department of Parks and Wildlife meaning that it is poorly known and from only one or a few locations.

References

confertum
Endemic flora of Western Australia
Plants described in 1989
Taxa named by Joy Thompson